The Barrel Springs Formation is a geologic formation in Texas. It dates as early Tertiary (Eocene to Oligocene).

References

Geologic formations of Texas
Eocene Series of North America
Oligocene Series of North America